This is a list of abolished CONMEBOL tournaments winning managers. Below are lists of head coaches who have won football tournaments which were played from 1988 to 2001 in South America (CONMEBOL zone).

These tournaments include:
 Supercopa Sudamericana - also known as the Supercopa Libertadores João Havelange, Supercopa Libertadores, Supercopa João Havelange or simply Supercopa, was a football club competition contested annually by the past winners of the Copa Libertadores. It was held from 1988 to 1997 and considered as second main continental tournament after Copa Libertadores.
 Copa CONMEBOL - the third most prestigious South American club competition between 1992 and 1999. Teams that were not able to qualify for the Copa Libertadores, played in this tournament.
 Copa Mercosur - was a football competition played from 1998 to 2001 by the traditional top clubs from Brazil, Argentina, Uruguay, Paraguay, and Chile. It was merged with Copa Merconorte and replaced by Copa Sudamericana in 2002.
 Copa Merconorte - competition played from 1998 to 2001 by clubs from Venezuela, Colombia, Ecuador, Peru, Bolivia, and later the United States, Costa Rica and Mexico. It was merged with Copa Mersur and replaced by Copa Sudamericana in 2002.

Also, CONMEBOL held other tournaments (Copa de Oro, Supercopa Masters, Copa Masters CONMEBOL), but they were not main continental competitions, were irregular, and participated among small number of teams.

Most often abolished CONMEBOL tournaments have been won by Brazilian coaches - 11 times, second place occupied by the Argentinians, with nine victories. This figure roughly corresponds to the number of titles of Brazilian and Argentine clubs, except for the victory of San Lorenzo de Almagro that won 2001 Mercosur Cup with Chilean specialist Manuel Pellegrini. Another foreign coach-winner was Luis Cubilla, Uruguayan, who led Paraguayan Club Olimpia to victory in 1990 Supercopa Libertadores. Only Cubilla and Brazilian Telê Santana (in 1993) won two the most prestigious club tournaments in South America during one calendar year.

The only coach, who won abolished CONMEBOL tournaments twice, was Émerson Leão. Moreover, he did it in a row with two different clubs - in 1997 he won Copa CONMEBOL with Atletico Mineiro, and year later same tournament with Santos.

List of winners

Supercopa Sudamericana

Copa CONMEBOL

Copa Mercosur

Copa Merconorte

References

External links
 CONMEBOL competitions

Managers
Managers
Managers
Managers
CONMEBOL